The Lighthouse of Carapacho is a beacon/lighthouse located along the cliffs of Ponta da Restinga, near the hamlet of Carapacho, civil parish of Luz on the island of Graciosa, the Portuguese archipelago of the Azores.

History

The 1883 Plano Geral de Alumiamento (Illumiation General Plan), proposed the construction of a fourth-order lighthouse, that would flash each minute and have a  range.

This first beacon used an incandescent red acetyline light, in two groups with a  range. 
 
By 1961, the light became a white beacon, improving its range to 

A solar valve system was installed in 1978, that allowed the light to become active or disactived based on the atmospheric conditions.

It was only in 1987 when the lighthouse joined the electrical network on the island.

Architecture

It is comparable to similar structures on the island of São Miguel, specifically the lighthouses at Ponta Garça and Ponta do Cintrão. The lighthouse consists of a round concrete tower, constructed with ribs, rising from a one-story building.

Accessible by road, the site is open to the public with access to the interior on Wednesday afternoons.

See also

 List of lighthouses in Portugal

References

Notes

Sources

 
 

Lighthouses completed in 1956
Carapacho
Buildings and structures in Santa Cruz da Graciosa
1956 establishments in Portugal